Paul Hoffmann is an American football coach.  He was the 30th head football coach at the Apprentice School in Newport News, Virginia and he held that position for eight seasons, from 1990 until 1997.

References

Year of birth missing (living people)
Living people
American football offensive tackles
The Apprentice Builders football coaches
William & Mary Tribe football coaches
William & Mary Tribe football players
Sportspeople from Norfolk, Virginia
Players of American football from Norfolk, Virginia